John Leanerd (fl. 1679) was a British playwright, notorious as a plagiarist.

Works
Leanerd published:

 The Country Innocence; or, the Chambermaid turn'd Quaker, London, a comedy acted at the London Theatre Royal in Lent, 1677, by the younger members of the company. It was The Country Girl (1647, sometimes attributed to Anthony Brewer) under a new title. 
 The Rambling Justice; or, the Jealous Husbands, with the Humours of Sir John Twiford, performed at the same theatre; the incidents are mostly borrowed from Thomas Middleton's More Dissemblers Besides Women, 1657.

To Leanerd has also been ascribed a comedy The Counterfeits, London, 1679, acted at the Duke's Theatre in 1678. The plot was taken from a translated Spanish novel The Trepanner Trepanned. Colley Cibber as author of She Would and She Would Not  either based his play on the same novel, or else borrowed extensively from the comedy.

Notes

 
Attribution
 

British dramatists and playwrights
People involved in plagiarism controversies
17th-century English writers
17th-century English male writers
English male dramatists and playwrights